The Land Justice League is a Hong Kong activist group that co-opts other social groups who are interested in a common cause known as “land justice”.

The membership is roughly divided into two groups—one rooted in activist movements dating to the protection of the Star Ferry Pier in 2006, which extended to the Choi Yuen Chuen rally in 2009; the other group consists of followers of the political party League of Social Democrats, run by longtime social activists. The former group of activists generally base their action on what is called a "localist movement" and they are a group of well educated youngsters with theory-based ideals. They also tend to plan their actions strategically. Their only shortcoming is that they are thin on resources. They are also fastidious about not being associated with any political party.

The group filled in candidates in the 2011 District Council election and 2015 District Council election but did not gain any seats. In the 2016 Legislative Council election, its core member veteran activist Eddie Chu ran as an independent and was elected by more than 80,000 votes, the highest number received by a candidate  in the legislature's geographical constituencies.

Objectives
The objectives of the Land Justice League are:
 To let city and village life run in parallel with each other – We are opposed to all kinds of gentrification of old urban neighborhoods which breaks up community ties, and unsustainable development of village and country land, which should be returned to farming mode.
 To preserve the natural environment – Profiteering must not be the excuse to destroy ecological life.
 To claim the right of a decent shelter for everyone – The right of accommodation is a basic human right.
 To eradicate real estate tyranny – We must no longer allow the few developer conglomerates exert control over our basic needs. Government must stop the commoditization of and speculation in land.
 To put an end to collusion between government, indigenous villagers and developers – A fair and open procedure and system must replace the present venal relationship between those parties in relation to the small house policy and land resumption for development.
 To institute a democratic land planning system – This applies to urban redevelopment as well as development of the countryside.

Electoral performance

District Council elections

References

External links
Land Justice League

2011 establishments in China
Localist parties in Hong Kong
Political parties established in 2011
Political parties in Hong Kong
Socialist parties in Hong Kong
Democratic socialism in Hong Kong